The Portaulun were an indigenous Australian people of South Australia.

Country
Their westward extension ran to Grote Hill.

Social organization
The Portaulun were divided into clans, the name of two of which are known:-
 Warawalde
 Welindjeri

The Welindjeri name is a post-colonial, being formed on the introduced toponym of Wellington, and thus meaning 'belonging to the Wel.'

History of contact
The last Portaulun full-blood was David Ngunaiponi, who died in 1967.

Notable people
David Unaipon.

Alternative names
 Putjin
 Warawalde
 Welindjeri
 Welinyeri
 Pomunda. (toponym, Pomunda Point)
 Poomunda
 Wellington tribe

Notes

Citations

Sources

Aboriginal peoples of South Australia